Halab District is in Ijrud County, Zanjan province, Iran. At the 2006 National Census, its population was 6,342 in 1,678 households. The following census in 2011 counted 6,760 people in 2,146 households. At the latest census in 2016, the district had 6,148 inhabitants in 1,976 households.

References 

Ijrud County

Districts of Zanjan Province

Populated places in Zanjan Province

Populated places in Ijrud County